Onilahy (or Ionilahy) is a rural municipality in Madagascar. It belongs to the Manakara-Atsimo District, which is a part of Fitovinany. The population of the commune was estimated to be approximately 5,000 in 2001 commune census.

Only primary schooling is available. It is also a site of industrial-scale  mining. Farming and raising livestock provides employment for 40% and 40% of the working population. The most important crops are cassava and rice, while other important agricultural products are bananas and oranges. Industry and services provide employment for 19.7% and 0.3% of the population, respectively.

Railroad
Ionilahy is a station on the Fianarantsoa-Côte Est railway.

References

Populated places in Fitovinany